Killbuck Creek is a tributary of the Walhonding River, 81.7 mi (131.5 km) long, in north-central Ohio in the United States.  Via the Walhonding, Muskingum and Ohio Rivers, it is part of the watershed of the Mississippi River.  It drains an area of 613 mi² (1588 km²).

Killbuck Creek rises in northern Wayne County and initially flows in a counter-clockwise loop northward into southern Medina County and past the town of Burbank before turning to a southward course through Wayne, Holmes and Coshocton Counties to its mouth at the Walhonding River, 5 mi (8 km) west of the city of Coshocton.  Along its course it flows to the west of the city of Wooster and passes the towns of Holmesville, Millersburg and Killbuck.

A USGS stream gauge on the creek at Layland recorded a mean annual discharge of  during water years 1924-1930.

Name
Killbuck Creek and the town of Killbuck are named for the Shawnee war chief Bemino (fl. 1710s–1780s) — known as John Killbuck, Sr, to the whites. According to the Geographic Names Information System, the stream has been known and spelled variously over the years:
Kilbuck Creek
Killbuck Run
Killbucks Creek
Kilbuck River
Kill-Buck River

The United States Board on Geographic Names settled on "Killbuck Creek" as the stream's name in 1963.

See also
List of rivers of Ohio

References

Rivers of Ohio
Rivers of Coshocton County, Ohio
Rivers of Holmes County, Ohio
Rivers of Medina County, Ohio
Rivers of Wayne County, Ohio